The Windspire Aeros is an American helicopter that was designed and produced by Windspire Inc. of Long Green, Maryland. Now out of production, when it was available the aircraft was supplied in the form of plans for amateur construction.

Design and development
The Aeros was designed to comply with the US Experimental - Amateur-built aircraft rules. It features a single main rotor, a two-bladed tail rotor, a single-seat enclosed cockpit with a bubble canopy and skid-type landing gear with integral ground-handling wheels. The standard engine used is a four-cylinder, air-cooled, four-stroke,  Volkswagen air-cooled engine.

The aircraft fuselage is made from a mix of aluminum and steel tubing. The drive train consists of a primary belt drive connected to a geared transmission built with Volkswagen gears and a belt-driven tail rotor drive.

The supplied plans include a fully illustrated guidebook and a parts list. The manufacturer estimates the construction time from the supplied plans as 300 hours.

Operational history
By 1998 the company reported that 40 sets of plans had been sold and three aircraft were completed and flying.

By April 2015 no examples had been registered in the United States with the Federal Aviation Administration.

Specifications (Aeros)

See also
List of rotorcraft

References

External links
Photo of a Windspire Aeros

Aeros
1990s United States sport aircraft
1990s United States helicopters
Homebuilt aircraft
Single-engined piston helicopters